Nicolás Alejandro Thaller (born 7 September 1998) is an Argentine professional footballer who plays as a centre-back for Atlético Tucumán on loan from Lanús.

Career
Thaller began his career with Lanús. He made his professional debut in an Argentine Primera División fixture with Patronato, being substituted on with eight minutes to go for Marcelo Herrera on 27 January 2018. A continental debut in the 2018 Copa Sudamericana followed a month later against Sporting Cristal, which was one of nine appearances Thaller made during 2017–18. In his second league appearance of 2018–19, Thaller scored his first goal in a 2–2 draw away to San Lorenzo.

On 18 January 2022, Thaller joined Atlético Tucumán on a one-year loan deal with a purchase option.

Career statistics
.

References

External links

1998 births
Living people
Sportspeople from Lanús
Argentine footballers
Argentine expatriate footballers
Argentine people of Austrian descent
Association football defenders
Argentine Primera División players
Club Atlético Lanús footballers
Atlético Tucumán footballers
O'Higgins F.C. footballers
Chilean Primera División players
Expatriate footballers in Chile